Operation Clean Heart was an anti crime operation carried out by Bangladesh Army, Bangladesh Navy, Bangladesh Rifles, Bangladesh Police and Bangladesh Ansar members in Bangladesh. The operation was carried by the government of Bangladesh headed by the Bangladesh Nationalist Party.

Operation
The operation took place from 16 October 2002 to 9 January 2003 led by Bangladesh Army. Brad Adams of Human Rights Watch criticised the shoot at sight order given by the Dhaka Metropolitan Police Commissioner Ashraful Huda to the police during the operation phrase. More than 40, 000 security personnel participated in the operation. The security forces included 24,023 army personnel and 339 navy personnel along with personnel from Bangladesh Police, Bangladesh Ansar, and Bangladesh Rifles. The joint forces arrested 11,245 suspects during the course of the operation. It had seized 2,028 firearms and nearly 30,000 bullets.

Hundreds were injured and 44 died in custody. Human Rights Watch had claimed 60 people were killed in the operation. The Government of Bangladesh claimed 12 of those deaths in custody were from heart attacks. Awami League leader Saber Hossain Chowdhury and Sheikh Fazlul Karim Selim, cousin of former Prime Minister Sheikh Hasina, were detained during the operation. The Army also raided the Awami League office and seized documents.  

On 9 January 2003 Bangladesh government created an indemnity law that provided legal protection to security personnel who participated in the operation. It was approved in the parliament of Bangladesh on 24 February 2003. Sultana Kamal, activist, criticized the indemnity ordinance. Justice Shamsuddin Chowdhury Manik criticized the drive and indemnity ordinance. After the operation ended, Rapid Action Battalion was created in 2004 with personnel from Bangladesh Police, Bangladesh Ansar, Bangladesh Rifles, Bangladesh Army, Bangladesh Air Force, and Bangladesh Navy.

Z I Khan Panna, a lawyer of the Bangladesh Supreme Court, had filed a petition against the indemnity ordinance on 14 June 2012. He was represented by Shahdeen Malik. On 29 July 2012, justices Mirza Hussain Haider and Kazi Md. Ejarul Haque Akondo asked the government of Bangladesh to explain why it should not declare the ordinance illegal and order it pay 1 billion taka compensation to the victims. In November 2015, the Bangladesh High Court declared the indemnity ordinance illegal and scrapped it. The verdict was given by Justice Moyeenul Islam Chowdhury and Justice Ashraful Kamal of the High Court Division.

Prime Minister Sheikh Hasina referred to Operation Clean Heart when defending her administrations record on human rights on 16 August 2020 following criticism by Bangladesh Nationalist Party which was in power when the operation was launched.

Deaths in the operation

References

Military history of Bangladesh
History of Bangladesh (1971–present)
Events in Dhaka
2000s in Dhaka